Crazy Faith is the fifth studio album by John Waller. City of Peace Media released the album on August 21, 2015. It is essentially a re-release of 2014's Life is a Gift, containing 9 of its 10 tracks. Added to this album is the "Movie Version" of the title track and three live tracks. The title track was featured in War Room.

Critical reception

Awarding the album four stars from CCM Magazine, Andy Argyrakis states, "His commitment to soul-stirring lyrics continues throughout Crazy Faith". Kevin Davis, indicating in a four star review by New Release Today, writes, "This album is sure to connect with all listeners who like sincere and catchy songs filled with truth and yearning for God." Rating the album a 4.3 out of five for Christian Music Review, Laura Chambers says, "As usual, John Waller does not disappoint." Joshua Andre, giving the album four stars at 365 Days of Inspiring Media, writes, "a thoroughly enjoyable and inspiring album".

Track listing

Track information verified from the album's liner notes.

References

2015 albums